Macropholidus is a genus of lizards in the family Gymnophthalmidae. The genus is endemic to South America.

Species
The genus Macropholidus contains four species which are recognized as being valid.
Macropholidus annectens  - Parker's pholiodobolus
Macropholidus ataktolepis 
Macropholidus huancabambae 
Macropholidus montanuccii  - Montanucci's cuilanes
Macropholidus ruthveni  - Ruthven's pholiodobolus

Nota bene: A binomial authority in parentheses indicates that the species was originally described in a genus other than Macropholidus.

References

Further reading
Noble GK (1921). "Some New Lizards from Northwestern Peru". Ann. New York Acad. Sci. 29: 133–139. (Macropholidus, new genus).

 
Taxa named by Gladwyn Kingsley Noble